As O. Panneerselvam who was Chief Minister from 2 March 2002 resigned, Governor appointed J. Jayalalithaa as the Chief Minister to head the New Government  and appointed 26 more ministers on the same day. It was her return to power as she had resigned the post earlier on 21 September 2001.

Cabinet ministers

References

Further reading 

 

Jayalalithaa 03
Jayalalithaa ministry
Jayalalithaa 03
Jayalalithaa ministry
Jayalalithaa ministry
Jayalalithaa ministry
India Jayalalithaa ministry
India Jayalalithaa ministry